The Second Mate is a 1950 British crime film directed by John Baxter and starring Gordon Harker, Graham Moffatt and David Hannaford. It was made at Southall Studios.

Cast
 Gordon Harker as Bill Tomkins
 Graham Moffatt as Paddy
 David Hannaford as Bobby
 Beryl Walkeley as Kate
 Charles Sewell as Joe
 Anne Blake as Fortune Teller
 Charles Heslop as Hogan
 Jane Welsh as Mrs. Mead
 Howard Douglas as Dusty
  Pauline Drewett  as Pauline  
 Tom Fallon  as Police Officer  
 Hamilton Keene as Bishop  
Pat Keogh  as Spike  
 Sam Kydd as Wheeler  
 Johnnie Schofield

References

External links

1950 films
1950 crime drama films
1950s English-language films
Films directed by John Baxter
Films shot at Southall Studios
Films set in London
British crime drama films
British black-and-white films
1950s British films